Lens Aboudou (born February 9, 1990) is a French basketball player who currently plays for JDA Dijon Basket of the LNB Pro A.

References

External links
LNB profile

1990 births
Living people
French men's basketball players
JDA Dijon Basket players
Olympique Antibes basketball players
Metropolitans 92 players
Sportspeople from Colombes
Shooting guards
Small forwards